The Hobbs Pirates was the final name of a minor league baseball club based in Hobbs, New Mexico from 1955 through 1961. Hobbs teams played as members of the 
West Texas-New Mexico League (1937–1938), Longhorn League (1955), Southwestern League (1956–1957) and Sophomore League (1958–1961), winning three league championships. Hobbs minor league teams hosted home games at Bender Park.

Hobbs teams were minor league affiliates of the Detroit Tigers in 1938, Washington Senators in 1956, St. Louis Cardinals from 1958  to 1959 and Pittsburgh Pirates from 1960 to 1961.

History
The first team in Hobbs was the 1937 Hobbs Dillers of the West Texas-New Mexico League, who also played in 1938. The franchise revived in 1955 with the Hobbs Sports, an affiliate of the Washington Senators and was a member of the Longhorn League and the Southwestern League. In 1958 the club joined the Sophomore League, became an affiliate with the St. Louis Cardinals and became known as the Hobbs Cardinals. In 1960, the club was finally named the Pirates, after the Pittsburgh Pirates began an affiliation with the team. Under the Pirates, Hobbs won league titles in 1960 and 1961. The Sophomore League folded after the 1961 season.

The ballpark
Hobbs teams played at Bender Park. The site is a now a park located at 1100 West Marland Boulevard
Hobbs, NM 88240.

Season–by–season

Notable alumni
 Gene Michael (1961)
 Thurman Tucker (1957, 1959) MLB All-Star
 Ron Woods (1961)
 Gary Waslewski (1960–1961)

See also
Hobbs Boosters PlayersHobbs Cardinals PlayersHobbs Drillers PlayersHobbs Sports PlayersHobbs Pirates Players

References

Baseball teams established in 1960
Sports clubs disestablished in 1961
Defunct minor league baseball teams
Pittsburgh Pirates minor league affiliates
St. Louis Cardinals minor league affiliates
Washington Senators minor league affiliates
1955 establishments in New Mexico
1961 disestablishments in New Mexico
Detroit Tigers minor league affiliates
Defunct baseball teams in New Mexico
Baseball teams disestablished in 1961